Manuel Ballesteros Sota (born 22 June 1949) is a Spanish professional golfer. He is best known as a European Tour champion as well as being the former manager and brother of Seve Ballesteros.

Golf career
Ballesteros was born in the summer of 1949 in Pedreña, Spain. He learned to play golf at Real Club de Golf de Pedre in his hometown and turned pro in 1967, at the age of 18. He had an early success, winning the Open Costa Vasca in September 1968, two strokes ahead of his uncle Ramón Sota. The event was played at Biarritz Golf Club in Biarritz, France, just across the border from Spain. Shortly after the victory, Ballesteros left professional golf for two years to perform national service for his country. He returned to professional golf in the early 1970s. In 1971 he was runner-up in the Swiss Open, a stroke behind England's Peter Townsend. He held the lead entering the final round but came back with a final round 73. The following year the European Tour was created which Ballesteros joined. For the first two seasons he played very well, recording multiple top-10s each season and finishing in the top 40 of the Order of Merit.

The 1974 season was much weaker. Manuel missed the cut in 11 of his first 12 events and was in serious danger of losing his card going into the final event of the year. With his back again the wall, at the El Paraiso Open in Marbella, Spain, he played excellently, finishing regulation tied with England's Peter Oosterhuis. The Englishman would birdie the first playoff hole to win but Ballesteros would maintain status on the European Tour.

Early in the 1974 season, his younger brother Seve turned professional. Witnessing Seve's great talents, Manuel decided to work full-time as Seve's manager and occasional caddie. Manuel stated later in life, "I had already been playing tournaments for seven years in Europe so I did everything for him, booked his air tickets, accommodation, everything off the course, so that nobody would bother him. All he needed to concentrate on was practice, practice, practice and playing, playing, playing."

Despite working for his brother full-time, Ballesteros still played on the European Tour part-time and performed relatively well. Between 1975 and 1980 he finished at least 41st place on the Order of Merit for all but one year.

During the early 1980s, however, his career began to wind down. He finished well outside of the top 50 of the Order of Merit during the 1981 and 1982 seasons. As the 1983 Timex Open approached, he hadn't recorded a top-10 in three years. The event was held at Biarritz Golf Club in Biarritz, France, the site of his only European circuit victory. Ballesteros shot −14 at the event to defeat England's Nick Faldo by two shots. It would be his only European Tour win. He would not play on the European Tour after the 1984 season.

However, later in life, Ballesteros would play on the European Seniors Tour for three seasons. His best season was 2000 when he recorded three top-10s and finished 35th on the Order of Merit.

Personal life
Late in his career, Ballesteros married Olga in 1982. He has four sons with her: Sergio, Jaime, Manuel Jr., and Robert.

During his career, Ballesteros was a shareholder in his Seve's business empire, Fairway, S.A. He held 5% of the company.

After Seve died in 2011, Ballesteros attended a charity pro-am in Wentworth, England, organized by Cancer Research UK. The event was entitled Ole Seve Pro-Am and raised money for research into brain cancer. The event included major champions Justin Rose, José María Olazábal, and Retief Goosen.

Professional wins (3)

European Tour wins (1)

European Tour playoff record (0–1)

Other wins (2)
1968 Open Costa Vasca
1976 Spanish PGA Championship

Results in major championships

Note: Ballesteros only played in The Open Championship.

CUT = missed the half-way cut (3rd round cut in 1973, 1979, 1983 and 1985 Open Championships)
"T" = tied

Team appearances
Double Diamond International (representing Continental Europe): 1972, 1973
Hennessy Cognac Cup  (representing Continent of Europe): 1978, 1980, 1982

References

External links

Spanish male golfers
Golfers from Cantabria
European Tour golfers
European Senior Tour golfers
People from Trasmiera
1949 births
Living people
20th-century Spanish people
21st-century Spanish people